Rod Steiger (April 14, 1925July 9, 2002) was an American actor, noted for his portrayal of offbeat, often volatile and crazed characters. Over his distinguished career he received three Academy Award nominations for his performances as Marlon Brando's mobster brother Charley in On the Waterfront (1954), the title character Sol Nazerman in The Pawnbroker (1964), and as police chief Bill Gillespie opposite Sidney Poitier in the film In the Heat of the Night (1967) which won him the Academy Award for Best Actor. He received two Primetime Emmy Awards nominations for Playhouse 90 and Bob Hope Presents The Chrysler Theatre. He also received two British Academy Film Awards nominations, and two Golden Globe Awards nominations with one win for In the Heat of the Night.

Major Awards

Academy Awards

Golden Globe Awards

Primetime Emmy Awards

British Academy Film Awards

Other Awards

Berlin International Film Festival

New York Film Critics Circle

National Board of Review

Hollywood Walk of Fame

References 

Steiger, Rod